Nelson Gooneratne (born 28 October 1934) is a former Sri Lankan cricket umpire. He stood in one Test match, Sri Lanka vs. India, in 1985.

See also
 List of Test cricket umpires
 Indian cricket team in Sri Lanka in 1985

References

1934 births
Living people
People from Sabaragamuwa Province
Sri Lankan Test cricket umpires